Kimlin Run is a  long 1st order tributary to Buffalo Creek in Brooke County, West Virginia.  This is the only stream of this name in the United States.

Course
Kimlin Run rises about 1 mile west of McKinleyville, West Virginia, and then flows east to join Buffalo Creek about 0.25 miles south of McKinleyville.

Watershed
Kimlin Run drains  of area, receives about 40.0 in/year of precipitation, has a wetness index of 279.16, and is about 85% forested.

See also
List of rivers of West Virginia

References

Rivers of West Virginia
Rivers of Brooke County, West Virginia